John Gilbert (died 1397) was a medieval Bishop of Bangor, Bishop of Hereford and Bishop of St. David's.

Gilbert was nominated to Bangor on 17 March 1372.

Gilbert was translated to Hereford on 12 September 1375.

Gilbert was Lord High Treasurer from 1386 to 1389 and then again from late 1389 to 1391.

Gilbert was translated to St. David's on 5 May 1389 and died on 28 July 1397.

Citations

References

 

1397 deaths
Bishops of Bangor
Bishops of Hereford
Bishops of St Davids
14th-century Italian Roman Catholic bishops
Lord High Treasurers of England
Year of birth unknown